USS Mount Baker may refer to the following ships operated by the United States Navy:

 , a Type C2 ship originally commissioned as Kilauea in May 1941 and renamed Mount Baker, March 1943. She was decommissioned and struck in 1969
 , is a  commissioned July 1972 as USS Mount Baker (AE-34), and in active service with Military Sealift Command

See also
 Mount Baker (disambiguation)

United States Navy ship names